Sohlan is a village of Abbottabad District in Khyber-Pakhtunkhwa province of Pakistan. Neighbouring settlements include Dhoba, Baghati and Chhar.

References

Populated places in Abbottabad District